Thomas Baker Slick Jr. (May 6, 1916 – October 6, 1962) was a San Antonio, Texas-based inventor, businessman, adventurer, and heir to an oil business.  Slick's father, Thomas Baker Slick Sr., a.k.a. "The King of the Wildcatters", had made a fortune during the Oklahoma oil boom of the 1910s. He was notable for discovering Oklahoma's then-largest oil field, the Cushing Oil Field.

Career

During the 1950s, Slick was an adventurer. He turned his attention to expeditions to investigate the Loch Ness Monster, the Yeti, Bigfoot and the Trinity Alps giant salamander. Slick's interest in cryptozoology was little known until the 1989 publication of the biography Tom Slick and the Search for Yeti, by Loren Coleman.  Coleman continued his study of Slick in 2002 with Tom Slick: True Life Encounters in Cryptozoology.  That book mentions many of Slick's adventures, in politics, art, science, and cryptozoology, including his involvement with the CIA and Howard Hughes.

Slick was a friend of many celebrities, including Hughes and fellow flier Jimmy Stewart. Stewart, for example, assisted a Slick-backed expedition in smuggling a piece of the Pangboche Yeti hand back to England for scientific analysis, Loren Coleman was to discover from Slick's files and confirmation from Stewart before his death.

Slick founded several research organizations, beginning with the forerunner of the Texas Biomedical Research Institute in 1941.  His most well-known legacy is the non-profit Southwest Research Institute (SwRI), which he founded in 1947 to seek revolutionary advancements in technology.  SwRI continues to advance pure and applied science in a variety of fields from lubricant and motor fuel formulation to solar physics and planetary science.  He also founded the Mind Science Foundation in San Antonio in 1958 to do consciousness research.

In 1955 he was awarded a patent for the lift slab method of constructing concrete buildings.

He was an advocate of world peace. In 1958 he published the book, Permanent Peace: A Check and Balance Plan.  He funded the Tom Slick World Peace lectures at the LBJ Library, and the Tom Slick Professorship of World Peace at the University of Texas.

Nicolas Cage was to have portrayed Slick in a movie, Tom Slick: Monster Hunter, but the project stalled.

Art collection
Slick was an avid collector of modern art. His collection was surveyed by the McNay Art Museum with an exhibition and catalogue titled Tom Slick: International Art Collector.

Death
On October 6, 1962, Slick was returning from a Canadian hunting trip when his airplane crashed in Montana.  Reportedly, the aircraft disintegrated in flight.  A wing broke off in violent wind shear over the mountains.

References

Sources

Biographies
"Slick, Thomas Baker Jr.", Texas State Historical Association
Loren Coleman, Tom Slick and the Search for Yeti, Faber & Faber, 1989, 
Loren Coleman, Tom Slick: True Life Encounters in Cryptozoology, Fresno, California: Linden Press, 2002, 
Catherine Nixon Cooke, Tom Slick, Mystery Hunter, Paraview, Inc., 2005,  (author is Slick's niece and former director of the Mind Science Foundation)

External links

Mind Science Foundation biography
Tom Slick Professorship of World Peace at the University of Texas
Tom Slick and peace
Tom Slick and the Dalai Lama

Patents
, Mill for Cutting Feathers, filed May 1945, issued May 1949
, Brush Puller, filed August 1947, issued December 1950
, Apparatus for erecting a building, (lift-slab construction), filed July 1948, issued August 1955

1916 births
1962 deaths
Accidental deaths in Montana
Cryptozoologists
People from San Antonio
Phillips Exeter Academy alumni
Yale University alumni
Harvard University alumni
Massachusetts Institute of Technology alumni
Victims of aviation accidents or incidents in 1962
Victims of aviation accidents or incidents in the United States